Edward Renfrow (born September 17, 1940) is an American politician and pastor. He formerly served as Auditor of North Carolina, state legislator, and controller in North Carolina. A Democrat, he served as state auditor from 1981 until 1993. In 2006, he became a pastor in a Baptist church.

Early life 
Edward Renfrow was born on September 17, 1940 in Johnston County, North Carolina. He graduated from Clayton High School in 1958.

References

North Carolina Democrats

1940 births
Living people
State Auditors of North Carolina
Baptist ministers from the United States